Frank E. Morriss (September 10, 1927 – July 3, 2013) was a film and television editor with more than fifty film and television program credits dating from 1968. He had a notable collaboration with the director John Badham extending from 1974 – 2004. Morriss' editing of Charley Varrick (1973) was nominated for the BAFTA Award. He was honored at the 1974 Primetime Emmy Awards as "film editor of the year" for the television film The Execution of Private Slovik. Morriss was nominated twice for the Academy Award for Best Film Editing: for Blue Thunder (1983, with Edward M. Abroms) and for Romancing the Stone (1984, with Donn Cambern).

Morriss was a 1946 graduate of Beverly Hills High School, where he was a three sport varsity letterman. He attended the University of Oregon for two quarters. In 1948, Morriss enrolled at Santa Monica College.

Selected filmography
The release year and director of each film are indicated in parentheses.
"L.A. 2017" (1971- Spielberg). Episode of the television series The Name of the Game.
Duel (1971 - Spielberg).
Charley Varrick (1973 - Siegel)
The Execution of Private Slovik (1974 - Johnson). TV movie.
The Law (1974 - Badham). TV movie; Morriss' first collaboration with John Badham.
Blue Thunder (1983 - Badham)
Romancing the Stone (1984 - Zemeckis)
American Flyers (1985 - Badham)
Short Circuit (1986 - Badham)
Another Stakeout (1993 - Badham)
Incognito (1997 - Badham)
Brother's Keeper (2002 - Badham)
Evel Knievel (2004-Badham)
Daydreams of Rudolph Valentino (2006 - Kozlov/Trevis). Short.

See also
List of film director and editor collaborations

References

1927 births
2013 deaths
American film editors
Emmy Award winners
University of Oregon alumni